Aberdeen Castle was a late Middle Ages fortification, in Aberdeen, Scotland. It was situated on Castle Hill, a site today known as the Castlegate, and the location of the castle is now occupied by blocks of flats.

Burned and demolished

It is thought the castle and fortifications were slighted by King Robert the Bruce as was his policy on recaptured castles in June 1308, during the Wars of Scottish Independence immediately following the Harrying of Buchan. Bruce and his men laid siege to the castle before massacring the English Garrison to prevent its use by the English troops of Edward II. It is said the Scots showed no mercy but "slew every man who fell into their hands. Edward I, indeed, had already set the example of executing his prisoners. It was not to be expected that the other side would fail to follow the same course" However, as of August 1308, Gilbert Pecche and the last troops were allowed to leave Aberdeen; this obviously cannot be accurate. On 10 July 1308, English ships left Hartlepool to help the English garrison. 

Legend tells that the city's motto, Bon Accord, came from the password used to initiate Bruce's final push and destruction of the castle.

Surrender to the English
The castle was surrendered to the English in 1295, and on 14 April 1296, the English King, Edward I arrived in Aberdeen and stayed in the castle as part of his suppression of the east coast of Scotland, having defeated the Scots.

Wallace

However, the following year, after defeating the English at Dunnottar Castle in 1297, William Wallace marched his men to Aberdeen during their campaign to retake the east coast for the Scots.

They found the English hastily preparing to leave in an armada of one hundred ships. The speed of Wallace's arrival from Dunottar caught the English unawares, and at low tide, the stranded ships were attacked in the harbour, the crew and soldiers slaughtered, the cargo taken, and the ships burnt.

John Balliol
The English Sheriff of Aberdeen, Sir Henry de Lazom had been left in charge of the Castle, but during the chaos of the attack, he defected, declaring it in the name of the Scottish King, John Balliol.

References

History of Aberdeen
Former castles in Scotland
Castles in Aberdeen
1308 disestablishments in Scotland